Jefferson Building may refer to:

Thomas Jefferson Building, in Washington, D.C
Jefferson Standard Building, in Greensboro, North Carolina
Thomas Jefferson Association Building, in Brooklyn, New York
Jefferson Apartment Building (disambiguation)

See also
Medical Dental Building (Dallas, Texas), formerly known as the Jefferson Building
Jeffersonian architecture
Thomas Jefferson Hotel, a former hotel
Jefferson Memorial (disambiguation)
List of places named for Thomas Jefferson